Alfred Feist (21 February 1835–3 December 1873) was a New Zealand brethren preacher. He was born in Chiddingly, Sussex, England on 21 February 1835.

References

1835 births
1873 deaths
New Zealand Protestant ministers and clergy
Millenarianism
People from Chiddingly